Rule of Threes is the seventeen single by Australian band Mondo Rock, released in 1986. It was released as a first single from Mondo Rock's fifth studio album Boom Baby Boom. The song reached at number 58 on the Kent Music Report.
The song was written by Mondo Rock's guitarist Eric McCusker.

Track listing 
AUS 7" Single

Charts

Personnel 

 Ross Wilson – vocals, guitar, harmonica (1976–1991)
 John James Hackett – drums, percussion, guitar (1981–1990)
 James Gillard – bass guitar (1982–1990)
 Andrew Ross – saxophone, keyboards (1986–1990)
 Eric McCusker – guitar, keyboards (1980–1991)
 Duncan Veall – keyboards (1984–1990)
Production
 Bill Drescher - Producer (tracks 1 & 2)

References

Mondo Rock songs
1986 songs
1986 singles
Polydor Records singles